William Bayard Shields (1780 – April 18, 1823) was a United States district judge of the United States District Court for the District of Mississippi.

Education and career

Born in 1780, in Maryland, Shields read law with Caesar Augustus Rodney. He entered private practice in Wilmington, Delaware until 1802. He was Secretary of State of Delaware in 1802. He resumed private practice in Natchez, Mississippi Territory (State of Mississippi from December 10, 1817) from 1803 to 1809, until 1812, and from 1814 to 1817. He was a United States agent to adjust land claims west of the Pearl River in 1804. He was a member of the Territorial Legislature of the Mississippi Territory from 1808 to 1809, and from 1813 to 1814. He was Attorney General of the Mississippi Territory starting in 1809. He was a Judge of the Superior Court of Mississippi and a Justice of the Supreme Court of Mississippi from 1817 to 1818.

Federal judicial service

Shields was nominated by President James Monroe on April 20, 1818, to the United States District Court for the District of Mississippi, to a new seat authorized by 3 Stat. 413. He was confirmed by the United States Senate on April 20, 1818, and received commission the same day. His service terminated on April 18, 1823, due to his death in Natchez.

Circumstances of his death

Shields obituary in the Natchez Gazette of April 23, 1823, describes his last days and death thus; "On the morning of the 16th inst. he had a severe attack of Apoplexy, which was followed by a severe derangement of his mind which continued in violent paroxyms, with intervals of apparent rationality, until the evening of the 18th when in a most agonizing exacerbation he relieved himself of sufferance by suddenly terminating his existence."

See also
List of justices of the Supreme Court of Mississippi

Note

References

Sources
 

1823 deaths
Judges of the United States District Court for the District of Mississippi
United States federal judges appointed by James Monroe
19th-century American judges
1780 births
19th-century American politicians
United States federal judges admitted to the practice of law by reading law